Hell to Pay is the second album by The Jeff Healey Band. It was released in 1990, and was one of the top 25 best-selling albums in Canada. In 1991. it was nominated for a Juno Award for "Album of the Year".

Guest musicians on the album include George Harrison, Jeff Lynne, Bobby Whitlock and Mark Knopfler.

The album was recorded at Le Studio in Morin Heights, Quebec, Canada in January and February 1990.

Track listing

Production 
 Producer – Ed Stasium
 Engineered by Paul Hamingson, assisted by Simon Pressey.
 Recorded and mixed at Le Studio, Morin Heights. 
 Mixed by Ed Stasium, assisted by Paul Hamingson.
 "Let It Go" remixed by Ed Stasium at Right Track Recording (New York City, NY), assisted by Paul Hamingson and Michael White.
 Mastered by Greg Calbi at Sterling Sound (New York City, NY).
 A&R – Mitchell Cohen 
 Art Direction and Design – Maude Gilman 
 Photography – Dimo Safari 
 Grooming and Styling – Lynne Ryan 
 Management – Forte Records & Productions, Ltd.

Personnel 
The Jeff Healey Band
 Jeff Healey – lead vocals, guitar
 Joe Rockman – bass guitar, backing vocals
 Tom Stephen – drums

Additional Musicians
 George Harrison – acoustic guitar and backing vocals on "While My Guitar Gently Weeps"
 Jeff Lynne – acoustic guitar and backing vocals on "While My Guitar Gently Weeps"
 Mark Knopfler – guitar and backing vocals on "I Think I Love You Too Much"
 Paul Shaffer – keyboards
 Bobby Whitlock – Hammond B3 organ on "I Think I Love You Too Much", "How Long Can a Man Be Strong", "Full Circle", "Let It All Go"
 Sass Jordan – backing vocals
 Kat Dyson – backing vocals

Chart positions and certifications

Album

Singles

Certifications

References 

1990 albums
The Jeff Healey Band albums
Arista Records albums
Albums produced by Ed Stasium
Albums recorded at Le Studio